In computer science, and more specifically in computability theory and computational complexity theory, a model of computation is a model which describes how an output of a mathematical function is computed given an input. A model describes how units of computations, memories, and communications are organized. The computational complexity of an algorithm can be measured given a model of computation. Using a model allows studying the performance of algorithms independently of the variations that are specific to particular implementations and specific technology.

Models
Models of computation can be classified into three categories: sequential models, functional models, and concurrent models.

Sequential models
Sequential models include:
 Finite state machines
 Post machines (Post–Turing machines and tag machines).
 Pushdown automata
 Register machines
 Random-access machines
 Turing machines
 Decision tree model

Functional models
Functional models include:
 Abstract rewriting systems
 Combinatory logic
 General recursive functions
 Lambda calculus

Concurrent models
Concurrent models include:
 Actor model
 Cellular automaton
 Interaction nets
 Kahn process networks
 Logic gates and digital circuits
 Petri nets
 Synchronous Data Flow

Some of these models have both deterministic and  nondeterministic variants. Nondeterministic models are not useful for practical computation; they are used in the study of computational complexity of algorithms.

Models differ in their expressive power; for example, each function that can be computed by a Finite state machine can also be computed by a Turing machine, but not vice versa.

Uses
In the field of runtime analysis of algorithms, it is common to specify a  computational model in terms of primitive operations allowed which have unit cost, or simply unit-cost operations. A commonly used example is the random-access machine, which has unit cost for read and write access to all of its memory cells. In this respect, it differs from the above-mentioned Turing machine model.

See also
 Stack machine (0-operand machine)
 Accumulator machine (1-operand machine)
 Register machine (2,3,... operand machine)
 Random-access machine
 Abstract machine
 Cell-probe model
 Robertson–Webb query model
 Chomsky hierarchy
 Turing completeness

References

Further reading 
 
 

 
Computational complexity theory
Computability theory